The 1983–84 season was Manchester City's 82nd season of competitive football and 18th season in the second division of English football. In addition to the Second Division, the club competed in the FA Cup and Football League Cup.

Second Division

League table

Results summary

Results by matchday

FA Cup

EFL Cup

References

External links

Manchester City F.C. seasons
Manchester City
Articles which contain graphical timelines